Uncial 0101 (in the Gregory-Aland numbering), ε 48 (Soden), is a Greek uncial manuscript of the New Testament. It is dated palaeographically to the 8th-century. Formerly it was labelled by TV. The manuscript has survived in very fragmentary condition.

Description 

The codex contains a small part of the Gospel of John 1:29-32, on one very small parchment leaf. The text is written in one column per page, 14 lines per page, in uncial letters.

The nomina sacra are written in an abbreviated forms.

Text 

The Greek text of this codex is a representative of the Alexandrian text-type. Aland placed it in Category II.

History 

Currently it is dated by the INTF to the 8th-century.

The codex currently is located at the Austrian National Library (Pap. G. 39780), at Vienna.

Karl Wessely published its text (facsimile). It was examined by C. R. Gregory (1887) and David C. Parker (2007). In 2008 it was edited by Stanley E. Porter and Wendy J. Porter (facsimile with transcription).

See also 

 List of New Testament uncials
 Textual criticism

References

Further reading 

 K. Wessely, "Papyrus Erzherzog Rainer. Führer durch die Ausstellung", Wien 1894, p. 129.
 U. B. Schmid, D. C. Parker, W. J. Elliott, The Gospel according to St. John: The majuscules (Brill 2007), pp. 115-116. [text of the codex in the Gospel of John]

Greek New Testament uncials
8th-century biblical manuscripts
Biblical manuscripts of the Austrian National Library